Ivan Šarić (born 16 January 2001) is a Croatian professional footballer who plays for Slovenian PrvaLiga side Mura.

Club career 
In July 2021, Šarić joined Slovenian PrvaLiga side Radomlje on a season-long loan from Hajduk Split.

Career statistics

References

External links

2001 births
Living people
Footballers from Split, Croatia
Association football forwards
Croatian footballers
Croatia youth international footballers
HNK Hajduk Split II players
HNK Hajduk Split players
NK Radomlje players
NŠ Mura players
First Football League (Croatia) players
Croatian Football League players
Slovenian PrvaLiga players
Croatian expatriate footballers
Expatriate footballers in Slovenia
Croatian expatriate sportspeople in Slovenia